Masconomet may refer to:
 Chief Masconomet, a sagamore of the historical American native tribe of the Agawam
 Masconomet Regional High School in Essex County, Massachusetts serving Topsfield, Boxford and Middleton.